Adrian Tibaleka is a Ugandan politician. She was appointed State Minister for the Elderly and the Disabled in the Ugandan Cabinet, on 6 June 2016. However, her appointment was rejected by the parliamentary appointments committee.

See also
 Cabinet of Uganda
 Parliament of Uganda

References

Living people
Members of the Parliament of Uganda
Government ministers of Uganda
People from Western Region, Uganda
21st-century Ugandan women politicians
21st-century Ugandan politicians
Women government ministers of Uganda
Women members of the Parliament of Uganda
Year of birth missing (living people)